Class 807 may refer to:

British Rail Class 807
ICE 2